Sport Club Guarany, also known as Guarany, is a Brazilian football club based in Cruz Alta, Rio Grande do Sul state.

History
The club was founded on September 20, 1913. They won the Campeonato Gaúcho Second Level in 1954, 1955 and in 1987, and the Campeonato Gaúcho Third Level in 1985.

In 1971, the team merged with local rivals Nacional to form the Associação Cruz Alta de Futebol, also known as ACAFOL. the merger ended in 1973.

Achievements

 Campeonato Gaúcho Second Level:
 Winners (3): 1954, 1955, 1987
 Campeonato Gaúcho Third Level:
 Winners (1): 1985

Stadium
Sport Club Guarany play their home games at Estádio Taba Índia. The stadium has a maximum capacity of 10,000 people.

References

Association football clubs established in 1913
Football clubs in Rio Grande do Sul
1913 establishments in Brazil